Levi Ying (1949–2013) was a Taiwanese politician. He was a member of the National Assembly before serving on the Legislative Yuan from 1999 to 2002. Ying relinquished American citizenship to seek political office in Taiwan, and regained American citizenship before his death in 2013.

Early life and legal career
Ying was born in Taipei, Taiwan in 1949. He received a bachelor's degree in political science from National Taiwan University and obtained a master's degree in East Asian studies from National Chengchi University. Ying then moved to the United States, and earned a SJD from Whittier Law School in California, setting up a law practice there prior to launching a political career in his native Taiwan.

Political career
Ying served in the National Assembly as a member of the Kuomintang. He renounced U.S. citizenship to take up the position. He was elected to the Legislative Yuan in 1998 as a New Party politician, and lost reelection in 2001, as all New Party legislative incumbents failed to retain their legislative seats.

Later life
After Ying's term ended, he moved back to the U.S. on a green card sponsored by his wife, who had remained a U.S. citizen, and he eventually naturalized as a U.S. citizen once again. He died on April 29, 2013, aged 64. His funeral was held at Rose Hills Memorial Park in Whittier, California.

References

1949 births
2013 deaths
New Party Members of the Legislative Yuan
Members of the 4th Legislative Yuan
Kuomintang politicians in Taiwan
Taiwanese emigrants to the United States
Former United States citizens
California lawyers
Whittier Law School alumni
National Chengchi University alumni
National Taiwan University alumni
Politicians of the Republic of China on Taiwan from Taipei
Party List Members of the Legislative Yuan
American lawyers of Chinese descent
20th-century American lawyers
Leaders of the New Party (Taiwan)